Locarno Airport , mil ICAO code LSMO, also known as  Locarno-Magadino Airport, is an airport located near the city of Locarno, Ticino, Switzerland. It is a mixed civilian and military airport. The airfield is used simultaneously by civilian aircraft and the Swiss Air Force from the "airfield command Locarno". Although they use the same runways, the Swiss Air Force has its own taxiways and parking and a large hangar.  It is located in the community of Gordola, seven kilometers east of the Locarno city center. The nearest stop to the Swiss Federal Railways is the 2 km distant station Riazzino of railway Giubiasco Locarno.

History 
The civilian section of the airport was opened in the summer of 1939. The military section followed the following winter. Since 1941, the Swiss Air Force use it most, because of good weather conditions, for basic flight training of military pilots. At the end of World War II, Swiss authorities identified existing locations that were to be modernized as regional airports, a second tier of infrastructure to support the primary urban airports, with Locarno-Magadino being one of the five.

Today
One paved runway, two grass runways, and one terminal are present at the airport. The airport is accessible by road by the Cantonale Street which connects to Route 13, which leads to a highway which bypasses the city and many interchanges help to get on and off the highway. The airport is bound by the scenic view of the Alps. The airport area itself includes companies such as the helicopter charter company "Eliticino", a partner of Heliswiss, Europe's largest skydive center "Para Centro", the flight school "Aero Locarno", the aircraft maintenance company "Aeromecchanica" and the Rega (air rescue) (Base No. Rega 6).

The majority of aircraft movement is performed by smaller private aircraft. Much aircraft movement also comes through civilian training flights and training flights by the Swiss Air Force, the helicopter charter company "Eliticino" and the local gliding club, the latter using the two grass runways exclusively.

In the period from 1999 to 2007, the airfield command spent around 100 million Swiss francs. The infrastructure has been completely renewed. It has a large new hangar with solar power system in which all aircraft are housed, a private, enclosed runway with private taxiway to runway 26R/08L. Furthermore, the new Hangar 5 was established for the parascouts stationed there.

Military aircraft
The most important Locarno command aircraft stationed at the airfield is the Pilatus PC-7 for completing basic training for aspiring military pilots. At the same time the airfield command Locarno is the unofficial base of the Aerobatics formation PC-7 Team, also the Pilatus PC-6 Turbo-Porter, Pilatus PC-9, Eurocopter EC635, Eurocopter AS532 Cougar, Eurocopter AS332 Super Puma and ADS-95 (RUAG Ranger).

References

Notes

External links 

 webpage (italian)
 Swiss Air Force page about Flugplatz Locarno
 Webpage from Para Centro Locarno

Airports in Ticino
Transport in Ticino
Military airbases in Switzerland